Nils Nilsen Ronning  (also N. N. Rønning; May 19, 1870 – June 25, 1962)  was an American author, journalist and editor.

Background
Nils Nilsen Rønning was born at Bø in Telemark, Norway. After he emigrated to America in 1887, he attended Faribault public schools.  He had studied for the Lutheran ministry and attended the Haugean Lutheran church Red Wing Seminary from 1887 to 1892. He attended the University of Minnesota from 1892 to 1896, received both a bachelor's and master's degree.

Career
Ronning was a journalist and publisher who was associated with several newspapers and magazines published in Minneapolis.  For several years he worked part-time for the Augsburg Publishing House of the United Norwegian Lutheran Church of America. He later published Christian literature for Lutherans and Scandinavian-American. Ungdommens Ven  was a religious magazine for young people published from 1890-1916 by the K. C. Holter Publishing Company with Bernt B. Haugan and Nils Nielsen Rønning serving as editors. Ronning was also associated with  Familiens Magasin from 1916–17  and  The North Star from 1917–22.

In 1923, Ronning started to publish The Friend. Unlike the Norwegian language magazines he had initiated earlier, The Friend was published in the  English language and proved a success. The magazine featured mainstream popular religious fiction and progressive themes. Norwegian-American writers such as Dorthea Dahl appeared in The Friend.

As an author, Ronning was a prolific writer whose writings appeared in both the Norwegian and English languages. Among the writings of Ronning are several books and a group of short stories.  He also completed a number of popular travel narratives and popular religious literature.

His most noteworthy work was the book Gutten fra Norge first published in 1924. This work was subsequently translated and issued in English as Lars Lee,  The Boy From Norway in 1928. The book provided a portrayal of the religious life of rural Norway in the 1860s. The story of Lars Lee as a pastor in the Norwegian Lutheran Church in America was continued in the novel A Servant of the Lord which was  published in 1931.

Selected works
A Summer in Telemarken (1903)
En sommer i Telemark (1904) 
Abraham Lincoln (1909)
Bare for moro (1913)
Gutten fra Norge (1924)
Da stjernene sang (1925)
Lars Lee: The Boy from Norway ( 1928)
A Servant of the Lord (1931)
The Living Word: Selected Bible Passages and Bible Readings (1931)
The Boy from Telemark (1933)
Words of Comfort: Precious Passages from Holy Scripture (1937)
Fifty Years in America (1938)
Lars O. Skrefsrud: An apostle to the Santals (1940)
The Saga of Old Muskego (1943)
Pioneer Sketches from Webster, Rice County, Minnesota (1947)
Select Sketches (1949)

References

Other reading
Skårdal, Dorothy Burton  (1974) The Divided Heart: Scandinavian immigrant Experience through Literary Sources (Univ of Nebraska Press)  
Øverland, Orm (1996) The Western Home: A Literary History of Norwegian America (University of Illinois Press)

External links
 

1870 births
1962 deaths
People from Bø, Telemark
People from Faribault County, Minnesota
Norwegian emigrants to the United States
American Lutherans
University of Minnesota alumni
20th-century American novelists
American male novelists
American editors
American male journalists
Novelists from Minnesota
20th-century American male writers
20th-century American non-fiction writers
American male non-fiction writers